Cactus Jack may refer to:

People with the nickname
 Mick Foley (born 1965), American actor, writer, professional wrestler, and color commentator
 John Nance Garner (1868–1967), American politician
 Jack Wells (sportscaster) (1911–1999), Canadian broadcaster
 Jack Neumeier (1919–2004), American high school football coach
 Travis Scott (born 1991), American rapper

Other uses
 Cactus Jack (band), a Serbian hard rock band
 Cactus Jack Records, an American record label
 Cactus Jack (film), or The Villain, a 1979 movie